The 2011–12 A-League National Youth League was the fourth season of the Australian A-League National Youth League competition. The season ran alongside the 2011-12 A-League season and the winner was the Central Coast Mariners, who won the championship for the first time. The league expanded from 9 teams the previous year to 10 teams with the Melbourne Heart participating in the competition for the first time.

Teams

Standings

Regular season

Round 1

Round 2

Round 3

Round 4

Round 5

Round 6

Round 7

Round 8

Round 9

Round 10

Round 11

Round 12

Round 13

Round 14

Round 15

Round 16

Round 17

Round 18

Leading scorers
Updated to end of round 10

References

2011–12 A-League season
A-League National Youth League seasons